Fistularia tabacaria, the cornetfish, blue-spotted cornetfish, tobacco trumpetfish or unarmed trumpetfish, is a species of cornetfish found along the Atlantic coasts of the Americas and in the central Atlantic off West Africa and the Macaronesian Islands. This species is of minor importance in commercial fisheries.

Description 
The cornetfish is easily mistaken for the needlefish; the defining characteristic that separates the two is the cornetfish's smaller mouth and jaws with an elongated face in comparison to the needlefish's elongated jaw and mouth. The cornetfish is greenish-brown dorsally with overall pale blue spots and lines.

Biology
Fistularia tabacaria is most frequently recorded in and over seagrass beds and coral reefs, although it also occurs over hard, rocky substrates. It is usually a solitary species that is very rarely seen in groups. It feeds mainly on small crustaceans and small fish.

It is an important component in the diet of the Atlantic bluefin tuna (Thunnus thynnus).

References

External links
 

Fistulariidae
Taxa named by Carl Linnaeus
Fish described in 1758